Capling Peak is a peak,  high, on the north side of Croll Glacier,  southeast of Bramble Peak, in the Victory Mountains, Victoria Land. It was mapped by the United States Geological Survey from surveys and from U.S. Navy air photos, 1960–64, and named by the Advisory Committee on Antarctic Names for Robert W. Capling, U.S. Navy, aviation machinist's mate and flight engineer on Hercules aircraft at McMurdo Station during Operation Deep Freeze 1967 and 1968.

References 

Mountains of Victoria Land
Borchgrevink Coast
Two-thousanders of Antarctica